Ancient Greek includes the forms of the Greek language used in ancient Greece and the ancient world from around 1500 BC to 300 BC. It is often roughly divided into the following periods: Mycenaean Greek, Dark Ages, the Archaic period, and the Classical period.

Ancient Greek was the language of Homer and of fifth-century Athenian historians, playwrights, and philosophers. It has contributed many words to English vocabulary and has been a standard subject of study in educational institutions of the Western world since the Renaissance. This article primarily contains information about the Epic and Classical periods of the language.

From the Hellenistic period, Ancient Greek was followed by Koine Greek, which is regarded as a separate historical stage, although its earliest form closely resembles Attic Greek and its latest form approaches Medieval Greek. There were several regional dialects of Ancient Greek, of which Attic Greek developed into Koine.

Dialects

Ancient Greek was a pluricentric language, divided into many dialects. The main dialect groups are Attic and Ionic, Aeolic, Arcadocypriot, and Doric, many of them with several subdivisions. Some dialects are found in standardized literary forms used in literature, while others are attested only in inscriptions.

There are also several historical forms. Homeric Greek is a literary form of Archaic Greek (derived primarily from Ionic and Aeolic) used in the epic poems, the Iliad and the Odyssey, and in later poems by other authors. Homeric Greek had significant differences in grammar and pronunciation from Classical Attic and other Classical-era dialects.

History
The origins, early form and development of the Hellenic language family are not well understood because of a lack of contemporaneous evidence. Several theories exist about what Hellenic dialect groups may have existed between the divergence of early Greek-like speech from the common Proto-Indo-European language and the Classical period. They have the same general outline but differ in some of the detail. The only attested dialect from this period is Mycenaean Greek, but its relationship to the historical dialects and the historical circumstances of the times imply that the overall groups already existed in some form.

Scholars assume that major ancient Greek period dialect groups developed not later than 1120 BC, at the time of the Dorian invasions—and that their first appearances as precise alphabetic writing began in the 8th century BC. The invasion would not be "Dorian" unless the invaders had some cultural relationship to the historical Dorians. The invasion is known to have displaced population to the later Attic-Ionic regions, who regarded themselves as descendants of the population displaced by or contending with the Dorians.

The Greeks of this period believed there were three major divisions of all Greek people – Dorians, Aeolians, and Ionians (including Athenians), each with their own defining and distinctive dialects. Allowing for their oversight of Arcadian, an obscure mountain dialect, and Cypriot, far from the center of Greek scholarship, this division of people and language is quite similar to the results of modern archaeological-linguistic investigation.

One standard formulation for the dialects is:

 West Group
 Northwest Greek
 Doric
 Aeolic Group
 Aegean/Asiatic Aeolic
 Thessalian
 Boeotian
 Ionic-Attic Group
 Attic
 Ionic
 Euboean and colonies in Italy
 Cycladic
 Asiatic Ionic
 Arcadocypriot Greek
 Arcadian
 Cypriot
West vs. non-West Greek is the strongest-marked and earliest division, with non-West in subsets of Ionic-Attic (or Attic-Ionic) and Aeolic vs. Arcadocypriot, or Aeolic and Arcado-Cypriot vs. Ionic-Attic. Often non-West is called 'East Greek'.

Arcadocypriot apparently descended more closely from the Mycenaean Greek of the Bronze Age.

Boeotian had come under a strong Northwest Greek influence, and can in some respects be considered a transitional dialect. Thessalian likewise had come under Northwest Greek influence, though to a lesser degree.

Pamphylian Greek, spoken in a small area on the southwestern coast of Anatolia and little preserved in inscriptions, may be either a fifth major dialect group, or it is Mycenaean Greek overlaid by Doric, with a non-Greek native influence.

Regarding the speech of the ancient Macedonians diverse theories have been put forward, but the epigraphic activity and the archaeological discoveries in the Greek region of Macedonia during the last decades has brought to light documents, among which the first texts written in Macedonian, such as the Pella curse tablet, as Hatzopoulos and other scholars note. Based on the conclusions drawn by several studies and findings such as Pella curse tablet, Emilio Crespo and other scholars suggest that ancient Macedonian was a Northwest Doric dialect, which shares isoglosses with its neighboring Thessalian dialects spoken in northeastern Thessaly.

Most of the dialect sub-groups listed above had further subdivisions, generally equivalent to a city-state and its surrounding territory, or to an island. Doric notably had several intermediate divisions as well, into Island Doric (including Cretan Doric), Southern Peloponnesus Doric (including Laconian, the dialect of Sparta), and Northern Peloponnesus Doric (including Corinthian).

The Lesbian dialect was Aeolic Greek.

All the groups were represented by colonies beyond Greece proper as well, and these colonies generally developed local characteristics, often under the influence of settlers or neighbors speaking different Greek dialects.

The dialects outside the Ionic group are known mainly from inscriptions, notable exceptions being:
 fragments of the works of the poet Sappho from the island of Lesbos, in Aeolian, and
 the poems of the Boeotian poet Pindar and other lyric poets, usually in Doric.

After the conquests of Alexander the Great in the late 4th century BC, a new international dialect known as Koine or Common Greek developed, largely based on Attic Greek, but with influence from other dialects. This dialect slowly replaced most of the older dialects, although the Doric dialect has survived in the Tsakonian language, which is spoken in the region of modern Sparta. Doric has also passed down its aorist terminations into most verbs of Demotic Greek. By about the 6th century AD, the Koine had slowly metamorphosed into Medieval Greek.

Related languages

Phrygian is an extinct Indo-European language of West and Central Anatolia, which is considered by some linguists to have been closely related to Greek. Among Indo-European branches with living descendants, Greek is often argued to have the closest genetic ties with Armenian (see also Graeco-Armenian) and Indo-Iranian languages (see Graeco-Aryan).

Phonology

Differences from Proto-Indo-European

Ancient Greek differs from Proto-Indo-European (PIE) and other Indo-European languages in certain ways. Ancient Greek of the classical period also differed in both the inventory and distribution of original PIE phonemes due to numerous sound changes, notably the following:
 PIE  became  at the beginning of a word (debuccalization): Latin , English six, ancient Greek  .
 PIE  was elided between vowels after an intermediate step of debuccalization: Sanskrit , Latin  (where s > r by rhotacism), Greek * > * > ancient Greek , Attic  "of a kind".
 PIE , which occurred in Mycenaean and some non-Attic dialects, was lost: early Doric  , English work, Attic Greek  .
 PIE "voiced aspirated" stops  were devoiced and became the aspirated stops   in ancient Greek.

Phonemic inventory

The pronunciation of Ancient Greek was very different from that of Modern Greek. Ancient Greek had long and short vowels; many diphthongs; double and single consonants; voiced, voiceless, and aspirated stops; and a pitch accent. In Modern Greek, all vowels and consonants are short. Some of the stops and glides in diphthongs have become fricatives, and the pitch accent has changed to a stress accent. Many of the changes took place in the Koine Greek period. The writing system of Modern Greek, however, does not reflect all pronunciation changes.

The examples below represent Attic Greek in the 5th century BC. Ancient pronunciation cannot be reconstructed with certainty, but Greek from the period is well documented, and there is little disagreement among linguists as to the general nature of the sounds that the letters represent.

Consonants

 occurred as an allophone of  that was used before velars and as an allophone of  before nasals.  was probably voiceless when word-initial and geminated (written  and ).  was assimilated to  before voiced consonants.

Vowels

Morphology

Greek, like all of the older Indo-European languages, is highly inflected. It is highly archaic in its preservation of Proto-Indo-European forms. In ancient Greek, nouns (including proper nouns) have five cases (nominative, genitive, dative, accusative, and vocative), three genders (masculine, feminine, and neuter), and three numbers (singular, dual, and plural). Verbs have four moods (indicative, imperative, subjunctive, and optative) and three voices (active, middle, and passive), as well as three persons (first, second, and third) and various other forms. Verbs are conjugated through seven combinations of tenses and aspect (generally simply called "tenses"): the present, future, and imperfect are imperfective in aspect; the aorist, present perfect, pluperfect and future perfect are perfective in aspect. Most tenses display all four moods and three voices, although there is no future subjunctive or imperative. Also, there is no imperfect subjunctive, optative or imperative. The infinitives and participles correspond to the finite combinations of tense, aspect, and voice.

Augment
The indicative of past tenses adds (conceptually, at least) a prefix /e-/, called the augment. This was probably originally a separate word, meaning something like "then", added because tenses in PIE had primarily aspectual meaning. The augment is added to the indicative of the aorist, imperfect, and pluperfect, but not to any of the other forms of the aorist (no other forms of the imperfect and pluperfect exist).

The two kinds of augment in Greek are syllabic and quantitative. The syllabic augment is added to stems beginning with consonants, and simply prefixes e (stems beginning with r, however, add er). The quantitative augment is added to stems beginning with vowels, and involves lengthening the vowel:
 a, ā, e, ē → ē
 i, ī → ī
 o, ō → ō
 u, ū → ū
 ai → ēi
 ei → ēi or ei
 oi → ōi
 au → ēu or au
 eu → ēu or eu
 ou → ou

Some verbs augment irregularly; the most common variation is e → ei. The irregularity can be explained diachronically by the loss of s between vowels, or that of the letter w, which affected the augment when it was word-initial.
In verbs with a preposition as a prefix, the augment is placed not at the start of the word, but between the preposition and the original verb.

Following Homer's practice, the augment is sometimes not made in poetry, especially epic poetry.

The augment sometimes substitutes for reduplication; see below.

Reduplication
Almost all forms of the perfect, pluperfect, and future perfect reduplicate the initial syllable of the verb stem. (Note that a few irregular forms of perfect do not reduplicate, whereas a handful of irregular aorists reduplicate.) The three types of reduplication are:
 Syllabic reduplication: Most verbs beginning with a single consonant, or a cluster of a stop with a sonorant, add a syllable consisting of the initial consonant followed by e. An aspirated consonant, however, reduplicates in its unaspirated equivalent (see Grassmann's law).
 Augment: Verbs beginning with a vowel, as well as those beginning with a cluster other than those indicated previously (and occasionally for a few other verbs) reduplicate in the same fashion as the augment. This remains in all forms of the perfect, not just the indicative.
 Attic reduplication: Some verbs beginning with an a, e or o, followed by a sonorant (or occasionally d or g), reduplicate by adding a syllable consisting of the initial vowel and following consonant, and lengthening the following vowel. Hence er → erēr, an → anēn, ol → olōl, ed → edēd. This is not actually specific to Attic Greek, despite its name, but it was generalized in Attic. This originally involved reduplicating a cluster consisting of a laryngeal and sonorant, hence  with normal Greek development of laryngeals. (Forms with a stop were analogous.)

Irregular duplication can be understood diachronically. For example,  (root ) has the perfect stem  (not *) because it was originally , with perfect , becoming  through compensatory lengthening.

Reduplication is also visible in the present tense stems of certain verbs. These stems add a syllable consisting of the root's initial consonant followed by i. A nasal stop appears after the reduplication in some verbs.

Writing system

The earliest extant examples of ancient Greek writing (circa 1450 BC) are in the syllabic script Linear B. Beginning in the 8th century BC, however, the Greek alphabet became standard, albeit with some variation among dialects. Early texts are written in boustrophedon style, but left-to-right became standard during the classic period. Modern editions of ancient Greek texts are usually written with accents and breathing marks, interword spacing, modern punctuation, and sometimes mixed case, but these were all introduced later.

Sample texts
The beginning of Homer's Iliad exemplifies the Archaic period of ancient Greek (see Homeric Greek for more details):

The beginning of Apology by Plato exemplifies Attic Greek from the Classical period of ancient Greek:

Using the IPA:

Transliterated into the Latin alphabet using a modern version of the Erasmian scheme:

Translated into English:
How you, men of Athens, are feeling under the power of my accusers, I do not know: actually, even I myself almost forgot who I was because of them, they spoke so persuasively. And yet, loosely speaking, nothing they have said is true.

Modern use

In education
The study of Ancient Greek in European countries in addition to Latin occupied an important place in the syllabus from the Renaissance until the beginning of the 20th century. This was true as well in the United States, where many of the nation’s Founders received a classically based education.
Latin was emphasized in American colleges, but Greek also was required in the Colonial and Early National eras, and the study of ancient Greece became increasingly popular in the mid-to-late Nineteenth Century, the age of American philhellenism. In particular, female intellectuals of the era designated the mastering of ancient Greek as essential in becoming a "woman of letters."
 
Ancient Greek is still taught as a compulsory or optional subject especially at traditional or elite schools throughout Europe, such as public schools and grammar schools in the United Kingdom. In 2006/07, 15,000 pupils studied ancient Greek in Germany according to the Federal Statistical Office of Germany, and 280,000 pupils studied it in Italy. It is a compulsory subject alongside Latin in the humanities branch of the Spanish bachillerato. Ancient Greek is also taught at most major universities worldwide, often combined with Latin as part of the study of classics. In 2010 it was offered in three primary schools in the UK, to boost children's language skills, and was one of seven foreign languages which primary schools could teach 2014 as part of a major drive to boost education standards.

Ancient Greek is also taught as a compulsory subject in all gymnasiums and lyceums in Greece. Starting in 2001, an annual international competition  was run for upper secondary students through the Greek Ministry of National Education and Religious Affairs, with Greek language and cultural organisations as co-organisers.

Modern real-world usage
Modern authors rarely write in ancient Greek, though Jan Křesadlo wrote some poetry and prose in the language, and Harry Potter and the Philosopher's Stone, some volumes of Asterix, and The Adventures of Alix have been translated into ancient Greek.  (Onomata Kechiasmena) is the first magazine of crosswords and puzzles in ancient Greek. Its first issue appeared in April 2015 as an annex to Hebdomada Aenigmatum. Alfred Rahlfs included a preface, a short history of the Septuagint text, and other front matter translated into ancient Greek in his 1935 edition of the Septuagint; Robert Hanhart also included the introductory remarks to the 2006 revised Rahlfs–Hanhart edition in the language as well. Akropolis World News reports weekly a summary of the most important news in ancient Greek.

Ancient Greek is also used by organizations and individuals, mainly Greek, who wish to denote their respect, admiration or preference for the use of this language. This use is sometimes considered graphical, nationalistic or humorous. In any case, the fact that modern Greeks can still wholly or partly understand texts written in non-archaic forms of ancient Greek shows the affinity of the modern Greek language to its ancestral predecessor.

Ancient Greek is often used in the coinage of modern technical terms in the European languages: see English words of Greek origin. Latinized forms of ancient Greek roots are used in many of the scientific names of species and in scientific terminology.

See also

 Ancient Greek dialects
 Ancient Greek grammar
 Ancient Greek accent
 Greek alphabet
 Greek diacritics
 Greek language
 Hellenic languages
 Katharevousa
 Koine Greek
 List of Greek and Latin roots in English
 List of Greek phrases (mostly ancient Greek)
 Medieval Greek
 Modern Greek
 Mycenaean Greek
 Proto-Greek language
 Varieties of Modern Greek

Notes

References

Further reading
 Adams, Matthew. "The Introduction of Greek into English Schools." Greece and Rome 61.1: 102–13, 2014. .
 Allan, Rutger J. "Changing the Topic: Topic Position in Ancient Greek Word Order." Mnemosyne: Bibliotheca Classica Batava 67.2: 181–213, 2014.
 Athenaze: An Introduction to Ancient Greek (Oxford University Press). [A series of textbooks on Ancient Greek published for school use.]
 Bakker, Egbert J., ed. A Companion to the Ancient Greek Language. Oxford: Wiley-Blackwell, 2010.
 Beekes, Robert S. P. Etymological Dictionary of Greek. Leiden, The Netherlands: Brill, 2010.
 Chantraine, Pierre. Dictionnaire étymologique de la langue grecque, new and updated edn., edited by Jean Taillardat, Olivier Masson, & Jean-Louis Perpillou. 3 vols. Paris: Klincksieck, 2009 (1st edn. 1968–1980).
 Christidis, Anastasios-Phoibos, ed. A History of Ancient Greek: from the Beginnings to Late Antiquity. Cambridge: Cambridge University Press, 2007.
 Easterling, P and Handley, C. Greek Scripts: An Illustrated Introduction. London: Society for the Promotion of Hellenic Studies, 2001. 
 Fortson, Benjamin W. Indo-European Language and Culture: An Introduction. 2d ed. Oxford: Wiley-Blackwell, 2010.
 Hansen, Hardy and Quinn, Gerald M. (1992) Greek: An Intensive Course, Fordham University Press
 Horrocks, Geoffrey. Greek: A History of the Language and its Speakers. 2d ed. Oxford: Wiley-Blackwell, 2010.
 Janko, Richard. "The Origins and Evolution of the Epic Diction." In The Iliad: A Commentary. Vol. 4, Books 13–16. Edited by Richard Janko, 8–19. Cambridge, UK: Cambridge Univ. Press, 1992.
 Jeffery, Lilian Hamilton. The Local Scripts of Archaic Greece: Revised Edition with a Supplement by A. W. Johnston. Oxford: Oxford Univ. Press, 1990.
 Morpurgo Davies, Anna, and Yves Duhoux, eds. A Companion to Linear B: Mycenaean Greek Texts and their World. Vol. 1. Louvain, Belgium: Peeters, 2008.
 Swiggers, Pierre and Alfons Wouters. "Description of the Constituent Elements of the (Greek) Language." In Brill’s Companion to Ancient Greek Scholarship. Edited by Franco Montanari and Stephanos Matthaios, 757–797. Leiden : Brill, 2015.

External links

 Classical Greek Online by Winfred P. Lehmann and Jonathan Slocum, free online lessons at the Linguistics Research Center at the University of Texas at Austin
 Online Greek resources – Dictionaries, grammar, virtual libraries, fonts, etc.
 Alpheios – Combines LSJ, Autenrieth, Smyth's grammar and inflection tables in a browser add-on for use on any web site
 Ancient Greek basic lexicon at the Global Lexicostatistical Database
 Ancient Greek Swadesh list of basic vocabulary words (from Wiktionary's Swadesh list appendix)
 
 Slavonic – online editor for Ancient Greek
 glottothèque - Ancient Indo-European Grammars online, an online collection of videos on various Ancient Indo-European languages, including Ancient Greek

Grammar learning
 A more extensive grammar of the Ancient Greek language written by J. Rietveld 
 Recitation of classics books
 Perseus Greek dictionaries
 Greek-Language.com – Information on the history of the Greek language, application of modern Linguistics to the study of Greek, and tools for learning Greek
 Free Lessons in Ancient Greek, Bilingual Libraries, Forum
 A critical survey of websites devoted to Ancient Greek
 Ancient Greek Tutorials – Berkeley Language Center of the University of California
 A Digital Tutorial For Ancient Greek Based on White's First Greek Book
 New Testament Greek
 Acropolis World News – A summary of the latest world news in Ancient Greek, Juan Coderch, University of St Andrews

Classical texts
 Perseus – Greek and Roman Materials
 Ancient Greek Texts

 
Ancient Greece
Languages attested from the 9th century BC
9th-century BC establishments in Greece
Languages of Sicily